William Hillyer Lyon (September 15, 1872 – April 3, 1957) was an American football coach. He served as the head football coach at the University of Mississippi (Ole Miss) in 1899. During his one-season tenure at Ole  Miss, Lyon compiled an overall record of three wins and four losses (3–4). Lyon was born in 1872 in Boonton, New Jersey. He was a member of the Phi Delta Theta fraternity.

In 1906, Lyon was working for a lumber company in Bridgeport, Connecticut as a travelling salesman. By the time of World War I, Lyon living in Bridgeport working as an accountant for the United States Government.

He died in Stamford in 1957.

Head coaching record

References

External links
 

1872 births
1957 deaths
Ole Miss Rebels football coaches
Eastern Kentucky University alumni
Yale University alumni
People from Boonton, New Jersey